The 366th Infantry Regiment was an all African American (segregated) unit of the United States Army that served in both World War I and World War II. In the latter war, the unit was exceptional for having all black officers as well as troops. The U.S. military did not desegregate until after World War II. During the war, for most of the segregated units, all field grade (majors and above) and most of the company grade officers (second lieutenants, first lieutenants, and captains) were white. 



World War I

The 366th Infantry was constituted 16 August 1917 in the National Army as the 366th Infantry, assigned to the 92nd Division, and organized at Camp Dodge, Iowa, in November 1917.

In World War I the regiment served overseas as a part of the 92nd Division, National Army and earned credit for battle participation as follows:

 St. Die Sector (Lorraine), 23 August 1918 – 20 September 1918
 Meuse-Argonne Sector, 26 September 1918 – 5 October 1918
 Marbach Sector (Lorraine) 8 October 1918 – November 1918

The 366th Infantry was demobilized 25 March 1919 at Fort Oglethorpe, Georgia, and reconstituted 16 December 1940 in the Regular Army.

World War II

It was activated 10 February 1941 at Fort Devens, Massachusetts and assigned to the Eastern Defense Command on 30 April 1942.

 Attached to the 1st Service Command on 1 May 1943 and to the XIII Corps on 1 September 1943.
 Moved to A. P. Hill Military Reservation, Virginia 14 October 1943 and to Camp Atterbury, Indiana, 23 November 1943, under XX Corps.
 Assigned to XXII Corps 21 January 1944, and staged at Camp Patrick Henry, Virginia 22 March 1944, until it departed Hampton Roads P/E (Port of Embarkation) 28 March 1944.
 Arrived North Africa 6 April 1944 and attached to 15th Air Force Service Command for airfield security duties from Sardinia to the Adriatic coast.
 Assigned to Fifth Army 4 November 1944 and arrived Livorno, Italy 21 November 1944, for attachment to the 92nd Infantry Division until 25 February 1945.
 Disbanded in Italy on 28 March 1945, and personnel transferred into the 224th and 226th Engineer General Service Regiments.

Combat chronicle   

Colonel Howard Donovan Queen was the commanding officer (CO) at the time of embarkation in March 1944. Although the 366th Infantry had been at "combat readiness", after a prolonged period which was devoted only to guard duty, Queen felt that they needed at least three months for preparation to be "combat ready". Queen wrote a significant request for withdrawal from active command and included his guarded reservations in regard to his deeply held tenets. In spite of this upper officials decided in November 1944 to attach the 366th Infantry to the 92nd Division. 

After continuing poor combat performance, including many instances of unauthorized withdrawals upon meeting the enemy, low morale, and malingering, the 92nd Infantry Division was believed by both German and American commands to be fit for only defensive roles. The division was completely withdrawn from the front in early 1945, with the infantry components of the division being reorganized from the ground up. Two of the 366th Infantry's three battalions were recommended "not be used again for offensive action unless urgent military necessity required it." The 92nd Division commanders proposed that the "366th be removed from the front lines and disposed of as higher headquarters might direct," which was accepted. The 366th Infantry Regiment was disbanded on 28 March 1945, with personnel transferred to the 224th and 226th Engineer General Service regiments.

Notable veterans

West A. Hamilton, commander who later served on the D.C. School Board and advocated for a National Memorial building for African Americans in D.C.
Edward W. Brooke III: First African American after Reconstruction elected to the United States Senate. (World War II veteran)
Frederic E. Davison: first African-American US Army Major General and division commander (World War II veteran)
William L. Dawson: First African American to chair a committee of the United States Congress (1949) (World War I veteran)
Aaron R. Fisher: Distinguished Service Cross recipient, World War I
John R. Fox: Medal of Honor (posthumous) recipient, World War II
James F. Hamlet: second African-American US Army Major General (World War II veteran)

General

The 366th Infantry Regiment was awarded two campaign streamers for the Colors; the first for Meuse-Argonne Lorraine (September 1918 to November 1918), and the second for Rome-Arno (January 1944 to September 1944).

The Regimental Shield incorporated the Cross of Lorraine. The Regimental Motto was, "Labor Conquers All Things."

See also 
 Military history of African Americans
 Winter Line
 United States Colored Troops

References

External links

America's Black Patriots - 366th Infantry Regiment US Army

366
Military units and formations in Massachusetts
Military units and formations established in 1917
African Americans in World War I
African Americans in World War II
African-American United States Army personnel